Jordán Bruno Genta (2 October 1909 – 27 August 1974) was an Argentine Catholic writer, philosopher, journalist and educator.

Career 
Born in Buenos Aires on October 2, 1909. He completed his secondary education at Colégio Nacional Mariano Moreno. He graduated from the Faculty of Philosophy and Literature at the University of Buenos Aires in 1933. The following year he began his teaching career at the Universidad Nacional del Litoral and at the Instituto del Profesorado de Paraná, where he taught Logic and Epistemology, Critique of Knowledge, Sociology and Metaphysics, subjects won by competition and antecedents. At the same time, he began a remarkable process of conversion to Christian philosophy, first, and to the Catholic faith, later.

In 1943 he was appointed Dean of the Universidad Nacional del Litoral and the following year he became rector of the Instituto del Profesorado de Buenos Aires, a position he held until his dismissal in May 1945. In 1946 he founded a private chair of philosophy, in which he taught until his death on October 27, 1974. His works include Fundamental Problems of Philosophy, Political Sociology, Psychology Course, The Philosopher and the Sophists, The Idea and Ideologies, Examination and Communism, Counter-Revolutionary War, Christian Political Option, in addition to numerous newspaper articles, courses and conferences.

He was murdered on Sunday morning, October 27, 1974, being shot eleven times on the doorstep of his home, in front of his family, and as he was on his way out to attend Sunday Mass in a neighboring parish, by a guerrilla command of the communist Ejército Revolucionario del Pueblo - 22 de Agosto (People's Revolutionary Army - August 22).

Legacy 
Genta's ideas influenced some sections of the military de facto governments, especially the National Reorganization Process (1976–1983). His staunch anti-communism and his contacts in the armed forces gained him some consideration from United States anti-communist operatives.

References 

1909 births
1974 deaths
Assassinated Argentine politicians
Argentine anti-communists
Argentine fascists
Deaths by firearm in Argentina
Argentine male writers
20th-century Argentine philosophers